Jeon Jun-woo (born February 25, 1986) is a South Korean professional baseball player for the Lotte Giants of the Korea Baseball Organization.  He represented the Korea national baseball team at the 2013 World Baseball Classic.

He qualified for FA after the 2019 season. Jeon signed a four-year, 3.4 billion won FA contract with the Lotte Giants.

Theme song 

 Starstrukk - 30H!3

References

External links 
 
 KBO Page

KBO League center fielders
1986 births
2013 World Baseball Classic players
Konkuk University alumni
Living people
Lotte Giants players
People from Gyeongju
South Korean baseball players
Sportspeople from North Gyeongsang Province